Bendones is a hamlet (aldea) and parish (parroquia rural) of the municipality of Oviedo, Asturias, Spain.

Bendones contains a 9th-century church, Santa María de Bendones, which was declared a national monument in 1958.

Parishes in Oviedo